Underneath or The Underneath may refer to:

Film and television 
 The Underneath (film), a 1995 film directed by Steven Soderbergh, starring Peter Gallagher
 "Underneath" (Angel), an episode of Angel
 "Underneath" (Arrow), an episode of Arrow
 "Underneath" (The X-Files), an episode of The X-Files

Music 
 The Underneath (band), a Japanese rock band

Albums 
 Underneath (Code Orange album) or the title song, 2020
 Underneath (Hanson album), or the title song, 2004
 Underneath (The Verve Pipe album), or the title song, 2001
 Underneath, by David Wilcox, 1999

Songs 
 "Underneath" (Adam Lambert song), on the 2012 album Trespassing
 "Underneath" (Alanis Morissette song), 2008
 "Underneath" (Tarja song), 2011
 "Underneath", by Buckcherry from Time Bomb
 "Underneath", by Jessica Simpson from In This Skin
 "Underneath", by Starflyer 59 from Old
 "The Underneath", by Robyn Hitchcock from A Star for Bram

Other media 
 The Underneath (novel), a 2008 novel by Kathi Appelt
 Underneath.com, an undergarment shopping comparison website

See also